MY Cephei (IRC +60375) is a red supergiant located in open cluster NGC 7419 in the constellation of Cepheus.  It is a semiregular variable star with a maximum brightness of magnitude 14.4 and a minimum of magnitude 15.5.

MY Cephei has an unusual spectral type of M7.5, one of the latest spectral types of any supergiant, and is one of the most luminous and coolest red supergiants, as well as one of the largest known stars.  If placed at the center of the Solar System, the star's surface would engulf the orbit of Jupiter and possibly even the orbit of Saturn.

Observations and variability

Observations of the open cluster NGC 7419 in 1954 showed that four of its members were luminous red stars, most likely red supergiants.  In addition, an unusually red star was found to be variable and probably an even more luminous supergiant.  This star was given the variable star designation MY Cephei in 1973 in the 59th name-list of variable stars.

MY Cephei is classified as semiregular variable star of sub-type SRc, indicating it is a cool supergiant, although its pulsational period is not known. It has been observed as bright as magnitude 14.4 and as faint as magnitude 15.5.  The star, along with another late red supergiant star, S Persei, are sometimes considered prototypes for the class of M6–7 supergiants.

Distance

Stellar properties
The spectral type of MY Cephei is given in the General Catalogue of Variable Stars as M6–7 Iab, indicating the star is an intermediate-size luminous supergiant star, although most authors gives M7–M7.5 I.  Classification is difficult because of the lack of comparable standard stars, but its spectrum appears to be later than M5, earlier than VX Sagittarii when at M9, and more luminous than M7 giant stars.  A 2021 study gives a spectral class of M3 based on infrared observations, and a correspondingly higher temperature.

MY Cephei is a very luminous, cool and large extreme supergiant star, with a luminosity more than 100,000 times that of the Sun and a radius in excess of a thousand times the Sun's radius. It is likely the most luminous, coolest, and the largest supergiant star in its open cluster, and occupies the upper-right hand corner of the Hertzsprung–Russell diagram.

The mass of MY Cephei is uncertain, but expected to be around 14.5 times the Sun's mass.

Humphreys–Davidson limit). This implies a higher radius of  based on an effective temperature of  derived using the DUSTY model, considerably larger than the upper radius limit of red supergiants at roughly  respectively.

See also
 NML Cygni — another late-type red supergiant or hypergiant star.
 WOH G64 — a late-type extragalactic red supergiant star.
 VY Canis Majoris — another large and luminous supergiant or hypergiant star.	
 Stephenson 2-18 — another large and cool supergiant or hypergiant star.

Notes

References 

Cepheus (constellation)
Cephei, MY
M-type supergiants
Semiregular variable stars
J22543171+6049388
IRAS catalogue objects
TIC objects